The Hito Esmeralda is a tripoint where Argentina, Bolivia and Paraguay meet.

Located within the region called Gran Chaco, the boundary marker marks a triple border region in South America; It is located more precisely 8km northeast of the Argentine town of Santa Victoria Este and 8km north of La Merced Mission, both in the province of Salta.

The Chaco limit was established by Hayes Case in 1878, and by the treaty complementary to the limits of 1939 signed in Buenos Aires, and ratified in Asunción in 1945.

References 

Argentina–Paraguay border
Argentina–Bolivia border
Bolivia–Paraguay border
Border tripoints